Events in the year 1976 in Germany.

Incumbents

West Germany
President – Walter Scheel 
Chancellor – Helmut Schmidt

East Germany
Head of State – Willi Stoph (until October 29), Erich Honecker (starting October 29)
Head of Government – Horst Sindermann (until October 29), Willi Stoph (starting October 29)

Events 
 February 1 – Germany in the Eurovision Song Contest 1976
 June 25 – July 6 – 26th Berlin International Film Festival
 July 1 – Mitbestimmungsgesetz
 October 3 – West German federal election, 1976
 October 17 – East German general election, 1976
 December 16 – The Second Schmidt cabinet led by Helmut Schmidt was sworn in.

Births 
January 6 – Judith Rakers, German journalist
January 9 – Simon Gosejohann, German comedian and television presenter
January 21 – Alexander Bommes, German handball player and journalist
January 21 – Kerstin Kowalski, German rower
March 12 – Andreas Erm, German race walker
April 6 – Anke Rehlinger, German politician
April 11 – Ruth Moschner, German television presenter
May 3 – Alexander Gerst, German astronaut
May 25 – Sandra Nasić, German singer
June 10 – Georg Friedrich, Prince of Prussia, German nobleman
June 12 – Katja Husen, German biologist and politician (died 2022)
June 19 – Abdoul Thiam, German footballer
June 30 – Christine Schürrer, German serial killer
July 10 – Lars Ricken, German football player
July 20 – Florian Panzner, German actor
September 26 – Michael Ballack, German football player
November 2 – Mike Leon Grosch, German singer
November 12 – Judith Holofernes, German singer

Deaths
January 18 – Friedrich Hollaender, German film composer and author (born 1896)
February 1 – Werner Heisenberg, German physicist (born 1901)
February 1 – Hans Richter, German painter and graphic artist (born 1888)
February 11 – Alexander Lippisch, German aeronautical engineer, a pioneer of aerodynamics (born 1894)
February 14 – Gertrud Dorka, German archaeologist, prehistorian and museum director (born 1893)
February 25 – Paul May, German film director (born 1909)
March 27 – Georg August Zinn, German politician (born 1901)
April 1 – Max Ernst, German painter (born 1891)
April 13 – Traugott Herr, German general (born 1890)
May 9 — Ulrike Meinhof, German terrorist (born 1934)
May 12 – Rudolf Kempe, German conductor (born 1910)
May 26 – Martin Heidegger, German philosopher (born 1889)
June 18 – Karl Adam, German rowing coach (born 1912)
July 1 – Anneliese Michel, German woman (born 1952)
July 5 – Anna Hübler, German pair skater (born 1885)
July 7 – Gustav Heinemann, German politician, former President of Germany (born 1899)
July 24 – Julius Döpfner, German cardinal of Roman Catholic Church (born 1913)
July 30 – Rudolf Bultmann, German Lutheran theologian and professor of New Testament at the University of Marburg (born 1884)
August 10 – Paul Lücke, German politician (born 1914)
September 9 – Gottlob Bauknecht, German businessman (born 1892)
August 10 – Karl Schmidt-Rottluff, German painter (born 1884)
October 3 – Hermann Pünder, German politician (born 1888)
October 18  – Paul Schmidt, German engineer (born 1898)
October 21 – Theodor Koch, German engineer and weapons manufacturer (born 1905)
November 8  – Gottfried von Cramm, German tennis player (born 1909)
November 30 – Fritz Rasp, German actor (born 1891)
November 30 – Armin Zimmermann, German admiral (born 1917)
December 14 – Friedrich Foertsch, German general (born 1900)

See also
 1976 in German television

References

 
Years of the 20th century in Germany
1970s in Germany
Germany
Germany